George Harley (1791–1871) was an English water-colour painter and drawing-master.

Life 
George Harley, born in 1791, appears as an exhibitor at the Royal Academy in 1817, when he sent two drawings of views in London. He had a large practice as a drawing-master, and drew in lithography some landscape drawings, as Lessons in Landscape, for Messrs. Rowney & Forster's series of lithographic drawing-books, published in 1820–2. In 1848 he published a small Guide to Pencil and Chalk Drawing from Landscape, dedicated to his past and present pupils, which reached a second edition.

Harley died in 1871, aged eighty, and was buried on the western side of Highgate Cemetery.

Works 
There are two water-colour drawings by Harley in the print room at the British Museum, one being a view of Maxstoke Priory, Warwickshire. A view of Fulham Church and Putney Bridge entered the collection of the South Kensington Museum.

Gallery

References

Citations

Bibliography 

  
 Cust, L. H.; Baker, Anne Pimlott (2004). "Harley, George (1791–1871)". In Oxford Dictionary of National Biography. Oxford University Press.
 Oliver, Valerie Cassel, ed. (2011). "Harley, George". In Benezit Dictionary of Artists. Oxford University Press.

1791 births
1871 deaths
Burials at Highgate Cemetery
19th-century English painters
English watercolourists